Jameh Mosque of Sari is related to the Qajar dynasty and is located in Sari, the district of Chinarban.
The Jameh Mosque of Sari is located in Nargesiye daily market in Chenarbon district in Sari, the capital city of Mazandaran Province, in North of Iran. It dates back to pre-Islam era and used to be a fire-temple of Zoroastrians of Iran in the North, next to the Caspian Sea. After the acceptance of Islam by the people in the region, a mosque, known as Jameh Mosque, was constructed on the site of the temple. It is the first mosque built in the North of Iran.

References

Mosques in Iran
Mosque buildings with domes
National works of Iran
Sari
Tourist attractions in Sari